Michael Babst (born 1977) is an American former soccer player and who is currently the head coach of the Davidson Wildcats men's soccer program. Babst was previously a head coach for the men's program at the University of Chicago.

Career 
On January 17, 2019 it was announced that Babst had accepted the head coaching job at Davidson College, making him the seventh head coach in program history.

References

External links 
 Davidson Wildcats bio

1977 births
Living people
Soccer players from Pittsburgh
Sportspeople from Pittsburgh
American soccer players
Association football midfielders
Boston College Eagles men's soccer players
American soccer coaches
Washington and Lee Generals men's soccer coaches
Duquesne Dukes men's soccer coaches
South Carolina Gamecocks men's soccer coaches
Northwestern Wildcats men's soccer coaches
Chicago Maroons men's soccer coaches
Davidson Wildcats men's soccer coaches